Mike Henderson (born in Independence, Missouri) is an American singer-songwriter.

Career

Early career
Henderson was an original member of blues group the Bel Airs when they formed in Missouri in 1981. They released an album, Need Me a Car, on Blind Pig Records in 1984. Henderson left the band in 1985 and moved to Nashville. The following year, he joined the roots rock band The Roosters. He was also a member of spin-off band The Kingsnakes. The Kingsnakes began playing weekly at the Bluebird Cafe in July 1986. They shortened their name to The Snakes when they were signed by Curb Records. An album, The Snakes, was released by Curb in 1989.

In 1988, The Fabulous Thunderbirds covered "Powerful Stuff", a song Henderson had written for The Snakes, for the soundtrack to the film Cocktail. Henderson later became a staff songwriter for EMI. His songs have been recorded by the Dixie Chicks, Trisha Yearwood, Gary Allan and Patty Loveless, among others. Henderson also found work in Nashville as a slide guitarist. He played on albums by Emmylou Harris, John Hiatt, Joy Lynn White and Kelly Willis.

Country Music Made Me Do It
Henderson's demos drew the attention of country music label RCA Nashville. RCA signed Henderson and released his solo debut album, Country Music Made Me Do It, in March 1994. Bob Cannon of Entertainment Weekly gave the album an A− grade, writing that Henderson's "enthusiastic field holler and his guitar's riveting twang give off enough sparks to ignite [the songs]." Dan Kening of the Chicago Tribune gave the album three and a half stars, saying that "Henderson downplays his guitar chops on his first solo album in favor of his songwriting and strong vocals and acquits himself admirably." The album also received a favorable review from Peter Cronin of Billboard, who declared that "Henderson comes to the party with plenty of attitude and a distinctive point of view."

The album's first single, "Hillbilly Jitters", peaked at number 69 on the Billboard Hot Country Singles & Tracks chart. When subsequent singles "The Want To" and "If the Jukebox Took Teardrops" failed to chart, Henderson was dropped by the label. "If the Jukebox Took Teardrops" was later a minor chart hit for Danni Leigh in 1998.

Edge of Night
After being dropped by RCA, Henderson founded the label Dead Reckoning Records with Kieran Kane, Kevin Welch, Tammy Rogers and Harry Stinson. His second album, Edge of Night, was released by Dead Reckoning in January 1996. The video for the first single, a cover of Eddy Clearwater's "I Wouldn't Lay My Guitar Down", was added by CMT in February 1996. Tony Scherman of Entertainment Weekly gave the album a B+ grade, writing that Henderson is "a good songwriter, even if he wears his influences a little too plainly." Parry Gettelman of the Orlando Sentinel gave the album five stars, stating that Henderson's "strong, slightly sandpapery voice is as soulful as it is twangy." Chet Flippo of Billboard also reviewed the album favorably, saying that "Henderson manages to sound at once world-weary and exuberant in a solid lineup of original material and country chestnuts."

First Blood
Later in 1996, Henderson formed the blues band Mike Henderson & the Bluebloods with Reese Wynans on piano, Glenn Worf on bass and John Gardner on drums. They released the album First Blood in October 1996 on Dead Reckoning. Mark Knopfler wrote the album's liner notes. Alanna Nash of Entertainment Weekly gave the album an A grade, writing that "First Blood'''s blistering, seamless blues covers prove [Henderson]'s a remarkable guitarist and frontman." A review in People stated that "when the combination of piano, bass, drums and electric guitar is as neck-snappingly strong as it is on the Bluebloods' first album, you don't need other instruments, original compositions or even many original ideas to deliver a knockout blow." Linda Ray of No Depression also gave the album a positive review, praising Henderson's "masterful guitar and vocals" and saying that "the way he plays that slide is likely illegal in several states." The song "Pay Bo Diddley" received some radio airplay.

Thicker Than Water
Mike Henderson & the Bluebloods released their second album, Thicker Than Water, in January 1999 with John Barlow Jarvis replacing Reese Wynans on piano. Becky Byrkit of AllMusic gave the album four stars out of five, writing that "Henderson contributes a particularly clear vocal style with plenty of simultaneous character from both the blues and true-blue country music." The album received a mixed review in People, which praised Jarvis' "richly layered, hard-driving solos" but compared Henderson's vocals to "the white-guy-trying-to-sound-soulful desperation of Dan Aykroyd and John Belushi in their Blues Brothers mode." Ed Kopp of All About Jazz gave the album a positive review, saying that "leader Mike Henderson is a highly capable slide guitarist, harpist, and singer, but the guy who makes this CD extra special is John Jarvis." Tim Steil of the Chicago Tribune also gave the album a favorable review, stating that "whether playing Hound Dog Taylor-ish slide, or blowing harp lines that would make Little Walter smile, Henderson deftly conjures the sound of '50s Chicago."

Later career
Henderson toured with Mark Knopfler on his 2001 Sailing to Philadelphia Tour. In 2008, Henderson was one of the founding members of bluegrass group The SteelDrivers. He played mandolin, resophonic guitar and harmonica and co-wrote most of the band's original songs. The SteelDrivers' 2010 album Reckless was nominated for a Grammy Award for Best Bluegrass Album at the 53rd Annual Grammy Awards in 2011. Henderson left The SteelDrivers in December 2011.

Adele performed Henderson's song "If It Hadn't Been for Love" for her 2011 DVD Live at the Royal Albert Hall''.

Mike Henderson has continued to play weekly shows at the Bluebird Cafe with the Mike Henderson Band.

Discography

Albums

Singles

Music videos

Awards and nominations

References

External links

1953 births
American blues singers
American country singer-songwriters
American male singer-songwriters
Country musicians from Missouri
Living people
People from Independence, Missouri
RCA Records Nashville artists
Singer-songwriters from Missouri